Jeffries  is a surname. Notable people with the surname include:

 Adam Jeffries (b. 1976), American actor
 Ben Jeffries (b. 1980), Australian rugby league footballer
 Bill Jeffries (b. 1945), former New Zealand politician
 Charles Jeffries (1864–1936), British Salvation Army officer
 Charles Adams Jeffries (1869–1931), Australian journalist
 Chris Jeffries (b. 1978), Canadian cross-country skier
 Clarence Smith Jeffries (1894–1917), Australian Victoria Cross recipient
 Darren Jeffries (b. 1982), British actor
 Dean Jeffries (1933–2013), American stunt performer and coordinator
 Derek Jeffries (b. 1951), English former footballer
 Donald Jeffries (b. 1956), American writer 
 Edward Jeffries (1900–1950), Mayor of Detroit, Michigan (1940–48)
 Fran Jeffries (b. 1937), American singer, actress and model
 Glenn Jeffries (b. 1961), West Virginia state Senator
 Greg Jeffries (b. 1971), American football player
 Gregg Jeffries (b. 1967), American baseball player 
 Hakeem Jeffries (b. 1970), American politician
 Herb Jeffries (1913–2014), American singer and actor
 James Jeffries (disambiguation), several people, including:
 James Jeffries (Louisiana politician), Louisiana Lt. Governor
 James Edmund Jeffries (1925–1997), Kansas congressman
 James J. Jeffries (1875–1953), boxing champion
 Jim Jeffries (baseball) (1893–1938), American Negro league baseball player
 Jim Jeffries (comedian) (born 1977), Australian comedian
 Jared Jeffries (b. 1981), American basketball player
 John Jeffries (disambiguation) several people, including
 John Jeffries (1744–1819), Boston physician
 John Jeffries II (1796–1876), American ophthalmic surgeon
 John Jeffries (judge) (1929-2019), former judge, local politician and senior civil servant
 John Calvin Jeffries (born c. 1948), law professor
 Kevin Jeffries (b. 1964), American politician
 Lang Jeffries (1930–1987), Canadian-American actor
 Leonard Jeffries (b. 1937), American professor of Black Studies
 Lionel Jeffries (1926–2010), English actor
 Maud Jeffries (1869–1946), American actress who married and settled in Australia
 Mary Jeffries (1854–1907), London brothel madam
 Mike Jeffries (CEO) (b. 1944), American CEO
 Mike Jeffries (soccer) (b. 1962), retired American soccer player
 Philip M. Jeffries (1925–1987), American set decorator
 Rich Jeffries (1938–2012), American former television announcer
 Ron Jeffries (b. 1939), American computer scientist
 Rosemary Jeffries, American nun and educator
 Sabrina Jeffries, American author
 Ted Jeffries (1908–1985), American football coach
 Thomas Jeffries (died 1826), Australian outlaw & prisoner
 Tony Jeffries (b. 1985), English professional boxer
 Walter S. Jeffries (1893–1954), American politician
 Walter V. Jeffries (b. 1962), American farmer, businessman, author and inventor
 Willie Jeffries (b. 1937), American college football coach

See also
 Jeffreys (disambiguation)
 Jefferies tube
 Jeffries Range, Canada
 Jeffry
 Jeffery (disambiguation)
 Geoffrey (disambiguation)
 Jefferies & Company
 Jeffers
 Haywood Jeffires (born 1964), American football player, whose family name is pronounced "Jeffries" 

English-language surnames
Patronymic surnames
Surnames from given names